Kache Ashar Golpo (Story of coming closer) is anthology series of telefilms promoted as a "collection of brave and unusual love stories" which premiered in January 2011 on NTV. The series airs multiple episodes only during special holidays such as Valentines Day and Eid and features many actors including Tahsan Rahman Khan, Jon Kabir, Nusrat Imrose Tisha, Rafiath Rashid Mithila, Safa Kabir, Afran Nisho .

Episodes

Season 1 (2011)
 Kache Ashar Golpo – Episode One : Rafiath Rashid Mithila, Aparna Ghosh
 Kache Ashar Golpo – Episode Two : Shajal Noor, Nusrat Imrose Tisha
 Kache Ashar Golpo – Episode Three : Arfan Nisho, Orsha

Season 2 (2014)

Season 3 (2015)

Season 4 (2016)

Season 5 (2017)

Season 6 (2018)

Season 7 (2019)

Season 8 (2020)

Season 9 (2021)

Season 10 (2022)

Reception
Shams Rashid Tonmoy, writing for The Daily Star, gave season five episode "Tomar Pichu Pichu" a rating of 8/10, praising the performances of Tahsan Rahman Khan and Bidya Sinha Saha Mim, and the story, although "the romantic buildup seemed a bit forced in the end".

Among the episodes of season six, Shams Rashid Tonmoy singled out "Shohore Notun Gaan" for being "an original story that provided a welcome change of pace" because it "uses love as a positive means of breaking [the] stigma" of the handicapped, rather than following the tired formula of "love despite obstacles".

References

Bangladeshi drama television series
Bengali-language television programming in Bangladesh
2011 Bangladeshi television series debuts
2010s Bangladeshi television series
NTV (Bangladeshi TV channel) original programming